Fred LaCour (February 7, 1938 – August 5, 1972) was an American professional basketball player. LaCour was selected in the 1960 NBA Draft by the St. Louis Hawks after a collegiate career at the University of San Francisco. In his NBA career, LaCour averaged 6.5 points, 3.3 rebounds, and 1.9 assists per game while playing for the Hawks and then the San Francisco Warriors. He also played one season for the San Francisco Investors of the National Industrial Basketball League in 1960.

High school career 
LaCour played on the varsity team at St. Ignatius College Preparatory in San Francisco, California. LaCour led his team to a combined 81–12 record in his three seasons. He was selected as California Mr. Basketball in 1955 and 1956.

NBA career statistics

Regular season

Playoffs

References

External links

1938 births
1972 deaths
American Basketball League (1961–62) players
American men's basketball players
Basketball players from San Francisco
Point guards
San Francisco Dons men's basketball players
San Francisco Warriors players
Small forwards
St. Louis Hawks draft picks
St. Louis Hawks players
Wilkes-Barre Barons players